Honor Diaries is a 2013 documentary film produced by the Clarion Project, whose films have been criticized by some for allegedly falsifying information and described as anti-Muslim propaganda. Honor Diaries explores violence against women in honor-based societies, with particular focus on female genital mutilation (FGM), violence against women and honor killings and forced marriage, and lack of access to education.

The film profiles nine women’s rights activists with origins in the Muslim (and non-Muslim) world, and follows their efforts to effect change, both within their communities and beyond. Honor Diaries premiered at the Chicago International Film Festival in October 2013 and won the Interfaith Award for Best Documentary at the St. Louis International Film Festival in November 2013. It was featured from December 2013 through April 2014 on DirecTV’s Audience Network as part of the Something to Talk About film series.

The Southern Poverty Law Center listed the Clarion Project as an "anti-Muslim hate group" in 2016-2019.

Content

Synopsis 
Honor Diaries traces the work of nine women’s rights advocates who came together to engage in a discourse about gender inequality and honor-based violence. Combining in-depth interviews and round-table discussions with archival footage, the film examines human rights violations in honor-based societies, and the growing trend of honor crimes in Western societies.

Structure 
Honor Diaries is divided into five main sections. The film begins with a broad analysis of women’s rights in Muslim-majority countries, drawing attention to issues such as lack of access to education and restrictions on movement. From there, the film expands on three major crimes targeting women: forced marriage, honor killings and female genital mutilation (FGM). In the final chapter, the documentary explores the rising trend of honor-based violence in Western societies, and efforts to silence voices of opposition by intimidation.

Featured interviewees 
The film features in-depth interviews with nine women who represent diverse communities throughout the Muslim and non-Muslim world. The women reside in the United Kingdom, the United States, Canada and Sudan. In the documentary, the featured women share their stories from their personal lives, professional work and their struggle to fight for broad-scale change.
 Nazanin Afshin-Jam 
 Nazie Eftekhari 
 Manda Zand Ervin 
 Fahima Hashim 
 Zainab Khan 
 Raheel Raza
 Jasvinder Sanghera
 Raquel Saraswati 
 Juliana Taimoorazy

Production 

Film production began in April 2012, prompted by producer Paula Kweskin’s participation in the Association for Women's Rights in Development conference in Turkey. There, Kweskin was introduced to numerous women’s rights activists, including Fahima Hashim, Director of the Salmmah Women’s Resource Center in Sudan and one of the featured women in Honor Diaries.
 
The nine women who are profiled in the film met for the first time at a gathering in June 2012 in New York. The film’s producers based the concept of the meeting on the salons of the French Enlightenment, in which women hosted assemblies of intellectuals to discuss progressive issues of the day. Subsequently, producers filmed women separately, in their home towns.

After more than a year in production, the film was completed in May 2013.

Filmmakers 
 Producer and writer of Honor Diaries, Paula Kweskin, is an Israeli human rights attorney specializing in humanitarian law. She received her J.D. from the University of North Carolina-Chapel Hill, and is a member of the New York Bar. Honor Diaries is Kweskin’s first film.
 Co-Producer Heidi Basch-Harod is the Executive Director of Women’s Voices Now. She is the author and editor of numerous print and online articles and op-eds that examine the rights of women in the Middle East and North Africa.
 Executive Producer Ayaan Hirsi Ali is a two-time New York Times bestselling author for her works Infidel and Nomad, and is the founder of the AHA Foundation. 
 Director and Editor, Micah Smith.  His documentaries have screened in more than 40 film festivals worldwide. 
 Producer and Writer, Alex Traiman. Traiman directed Iranium. 
 Executive Producer Raphael Shore is an Israeli filmmaker who has produced other films such as Obsession: Radical Islam’s War Against the West, The Third Jihad: Radical Islam's Vision For America, and Iranium.

Coalition partners 
The film website claims the following organizations have supported the promotion and distribution of Honor Diaries:
 AHA Foundation
 All Afghan Women's Union
 Alliance of Iranian Women
 American Islamic Forum for Democracy
 Americans Overseas Domestic Violence Crisis Center
 A Call To Men
 Breakthrough
 Canadian Women for Women in Afghanistan
 Canadian Women's Foundation
 The Clarion Project
 Congress of Racial Equality
 Cooperation Center for Afghanistan 
 Council for Muslims Facing Tomorrow
 Fistula Foundation
 FORWARD
 Girls' Globe
 Karma Nirvana
 LIBFORALL
 Men Can Stop Rape
 The MILLA Project
 Nika Water 
 SAFSS
 Shuhada Organization
 Tehrik-e-Niswan
 Women’s Voices Now
 World Pulse

Release and reception 
Honor Diaries premiered at the Chicago International Film Festival in October 2013. One month later, the film screened at the St. Louis International Film Festival, where it won the Interfaith Award for Best Documentary. It featured throughout December 2013 on DirecTV’s Something to Talk About film series on the Audience network (Channel 239).

The international launch of Honor Diaries  coincided with International Women’s Day on March 8, 2014.

Media reception

Awards 
Honor Diaries won the Interfaith Award at the St. Louis International Film Festival in 2013.

The film was nominated for a 2015 Islamophobia award, with the nomination stating it "portrays Muslims societies as misogynistic, backward, and dominated by brutal practices that oppress women and stifle  debate around practices".

See also
Duma (2011 film)

References

External links 
 
 
 Antagony and Ecstasy

2013 films
Documentary films about violence against women
American documentary films
Documentary films critical of Islam
Works about female genital mutilation
Forced marriage
Documentary films about honor killing
Films about activists
2013 documentary films
2010s English-language films
2010s American films